Corwin Herman Hansch (October 6, 1918 – May 8, 2011) was a Professor of Chemistry at Pomona College in California. He became known as the 'father of computer-assisted molecule design.'

Education and Career
Hansch was born on October 6, 1918 in Kenmare, North Dakota. He earned a BS from the University of Illinois in 1940 and a PhD from New York University in 1944. He briefly worked as a postdoc at the University of Illinois Chicago.

Hansch worked on the Manhattan Project at the University of Chicago and as a group leader at DuPont Nemours in Richland, Washington. In February 1946 he received an academic position at Pomona College, where he taught until 1988. Hansch completed sabbaticals at ETH Zurich with Vladimir Prelog and at University of Munich with Rolf Huisgen.

Hansch taught Organic Chemistry for many years at Pomona College, and was known for giving complex lectures without using notes. His course in Physical Bio-Organic Medicinal Chemistry was ground-breaking at an undergraduate level.

Hansch may be best known as the father of the concept of quantitative structure-activity relationship (QSAR), the quantitative correlation of the physicochemical properties of molecules with their biological activities.

He is also noted for the Hansch equation, which is used in 
Multivariate Statistics - Multivariate statistics is  a set of statistical tools to analyse data (e.g., chemical and biological) matrices using regression and/or pattern recognition techniques.
Hansch Analysis - Hansch analysis is the investigation of the quantitative relationship between the biological activity of a series of compounds and their physicochemical substituent or global parameters representing hydrophobic, electronic, steric and other effects using multiple regression correlation methodology.
Hansch-Fujita  constant - The Hansch-Fujita  constant describes the contribution of a substituent to the lipophilicity of a compound.

Research Interests:
Organic Chemistry; Interaction of organic chemicals with living organisms, Quantitative Structure Activity Relationships (QSAR).

Fragment based regression analysis for quantitative structure-activity relationship (Hansch-analysis)

Death
He died of pneumonia on May 8, 2011 in Claremont, California at 92.

Notes
His research group at Pomona College worked on QSAR studies and in building and expanding the database of chemical and physical data as C-QSAR and Bioloom. His postgraduate associates were Rajni Garg, Cynthia R. D. Selassie, Suresh Babu Mekapati, and Alka Kurup.

The Journal of Computer-Aided Molecular Design carried four obituaries (as found in a Pubmed personal subject [ps] search).

Among his students at Pomona was Jennifer Doudna, co-recipient of the 2020 Nobel Prize in Chemistry. Doudna has credited Hansch as an influence.

Bibliography
A preliminary search in WorldCat and in PubMed, two among many relevant bibliographic and citation indexes, shows the following:
 Books: WorldCat shows "53 works in 204 publications in 4 languages and 2,004 library holdings" for Hansch as "author, editor, other". The top item in the list is "Exploring QSAR" by Corwin Hansch, Albert Leo and David Hoekman, an ACS professional reference book in 28 editions published between 1995 and 2014.
 Journal articles: 281 Pubmed records
 Reviews: authored 33 reviews as indexed in Pubmed
 Title word search: 56 Pubmed records

The Pomona College Archives holds reprints of Hansch’s articles published between 1962 and 2009 in addition to other materials.

See also
 Hammett equation
 Craig plot
 David Weininger

References

External links
Example for Hansch equation and Hansch-Fujita  constant
Corwin Hansch, The QSAR and Modelling Society News, October 1998
  Corwin Hansch Collection, Pomona College Archives. Pomona College. Claremont, CA 91711, Guide to the Corwin Hansch Collection
Former homepage - url, Pomona College
Corwin Hansch Award at the Hansch-Fujita Foundation, 2000-

American pharmacologists
Manhattan Project people
2011 deaths
1918 births
People from Ward County, North Dakota
Courant Institute of Mathematical Sciences alumni
University of Illinois alumni
Pomona College faculty
Cheminformatics
New York University alumni